Lewis Gannett is an American writer. He is the author of the books The Living One, Magazine Beach, The Siege, and two Millennium novels: Gehenna and Force Majeure.

External links
FantasticFiction

Year of birth missing (living people)
Living people
American male novelists
American non-fiction writers
American male non-fiction writers
Place of birth missing (living people)